Jeffer Rosobin (born 5 January 1976) is a retired badminton player from Indonesia. He was the men's singles champion at the 1996 Asian Championships, and once occupied the top 10 BWF rankings. Rosobin was recorded as a Singapore national coach. In 2017, he joined the Indonesia national training camp, as a women's singles coach.

Achievements

World Cup 
Men's singles

Asian Championships 
Men's singles

IBF World Grand Prix 
The World Badminton Grand Prix sanctioned by International Badminton Federation (IBF) since 1983.

Men's singles

 IBF Grand Prix tournament
 IBF Grand Prix Finals tournament

IBF International 
Men's singles

References

External links 
 

1976 births
Living people
Sportspeople from Riau
Indonesian male badminton players
Competitors at the 1999 Southeast Asian Games
Southeast Asian Games gold medalists for Indonesia
Southeast Asian Games medalists in badminton
Badminton coaches
20th-century Indonesian people
21st-century Indonesian people